CJAQ-FM is a Canadian radio station, which broadcasts at 96.9 FM in Calgary, Alberta. The station uses the on-air brand name Jack 96.9. It is the second "Jack" station in Canada and the world, after its sister CJAX-FM in Vancouver. CJAQ's studios are located on 7th Avenue Southwest in downtown Calgary, while its transmitter is located on Patina Hill Drive Southwest in the Prominence Point neighbourhood in west Calgary.

As of Winter 2020, CJAQ is the 8th-most-listened-to radio station in the Calgary market according to a PPM data report released by Numeris.

History
The station originally signed on in 1927 as CJCJ, an AM radio station located on 1230 AM. In the 1941 great frequency shuffle of most North American AM stations it moved to its longtime frequency of 1140. In 1950, it adopted the call letters that it would become most historically identified with by most Calgary radio listeners, CKXL (or simply "XL" for short). It adopted a Top 40 format in 1964. On September 4, 1987, the station dropped Top 40 for adult contemporary as Kiss AM 1140 with the CISS call letters. A year later it went oldies full-time. 2 talk shows (Charles Adler and the Larry King Show) were also added briefly in 1990. In September 1991, the station flipped to classic rock as The Fox with the CFXX, and, later on, CFXL call letters. On June 3, 1996, the station moved to the FM band and changed formats to Hot AC as Kiss FM, with the CKIS calls (previously, they were used by CHUM Radio-owned CKGM Montreal). "Pirate Radio with Chris Sheppard" was a featured show on the station at the time. The station changed calls to CHRK in 1999 and returned to classic rock as Rock 97 when Rogers acquired the station. CHRK was one of three rock stations in Calgary at the time, alongside Power 107 and CJAY 92; the latter rock station still uses this brand today. The station changed to urban music on July 19, 2002, and returned the "Kiss" branding to the station. On April 1, 2003, at midnight, the station returned to its CKIS calls and flipped to its current format.

The station flipped call signs with CJAQ in Toronto, Ontario in June 2009, after the Toronto station was rebranded from "Jack FM" to "Kiss".

Previous Jack FM logos

Rebroadcasters
CJAQ-FM has repeaters in Alberta and British Columbia:

1 In 1997, rebroadcaster CJAQ-FM-1 received CRTC approval to operate at 94.3 FM, until it moved to its current frequency at 94.1 FM in 2004.

References

External links
 
 CJAQ-FM history - Canadian Communications Foundation
 

Jack FM stations
Jaq
Jaq
Jaq
Radio stations established in 1927
1927 establishments in Alberta